Alpha Kappa Pi  was a collegiate social fraternity founded in 1921 at the Newark College of Engineering. In 1946 it merged with Alpha Sigma Phi.

History
Alpha Kappa Pi was a Social Fraternity founded on Jan. 1, 1921 at Newark College of Engineering (now New Jersey Institute of Technology), under the name Phi Delta Zeta. A committee was formed to complete a plan for nationalization, largely by absorbing local fraternity chapters.  It established its Beta chapter in 1926 at Wagner College (in New York), lending the name of the Wagner local chapter to become the name of the new national, now Alpha Kappa Pi, and adding two more chapters that year.  Alpha Kappa Pi would go on to form 36 chapters over the next two decades.

In addition to the absorption of local chapters, three of the remaining chapters of Sigma Delta Rho were added in 1936-37, as were two chapters of disintegrating Theta Nu Epsilon, in 1940.

On , Alpha Kappa Pi merged with Alpha Sigma Phi, mostly resulting in new chapters. There were only two campuses where a local merger was effected, as both groups were active there.

Symbols
Colors: Dartmouth green (i.e., dark green) and white

Flower: Yellow tea rose

Magazine: The Alpha 

Badge: 7-pointed gold star with black enamel; on the enamel, crossed swords and the Greek letters.

Total membership as of 1940: 3,105.

Chapters
Chapters of Alpha Kappa Pi, with current school names. Active chapters at the time of the  merger are in bold, inactive chapters in italics.

References

External links
Archives of The Alpha

Defunct former members of the North American Interfraternity Conference
Student organizations established in 1921
1921 establishments in New Jersey
Alpha Sigma Phi